Paul Balthazar Getty (born January 22, 1975) is an American actor and musician. His acting debut was in Lord of the Flies (1990) as Ralph. He went on to appear in Lost Highway (1997) and had a recurring role as Richard Montana in Charmed (2003–04), Thomas Grace on the American action drama Alias (2005–06), and Tommy Walker on the American drama Brothers & Sisters (2006–11), the latter two of which have aired on ABC.

As a musician, Getty is a member of the indie rock/electronic band Ringside, and is the producer for rap duo The Wow.

Early life
Paul Balthazar Getty was born January 22, 1975, in Tarzana, California, and brought up in San Francisco before being educated in the United Kingdom at Gordonstoun, Scotland. He was born to father John Paul Getty III and is a descendant of grandfather Sir John Paul Getty and great-grandfather J. Paul Getty, founder of Getty Oil, and at one time one of the richest men in the world, namesake for the Getty Center museum. His mother, Gisela Getty (née Schmidt), is a German-born professional photographer and documentary filmmaker. His parents divorced in 1993. His sister Anna (born 1972) is the daughter of his mother and his father adopted her.

Film career
Getty began his acting career at age 12 in 1987. He auditioned for the lead role in the movie Lord of the Flies after being spotted by a casting director Robin Joy Allan, in his art class at school. During the 1990s and early 2000s, he appeared in the films Young Guns II, Natural Born Killers, Judge Dredd, Mr. Holland's Opus, White Squall, Lost Highway, Big City Blues, The Center of the World, Deuces Wild, Ladder 49, Feast, and the television miniseries Traffic.

Getty guest-starred on the television series Charmed as Richard Montana, a male witch romantically linked with Paige Matthews. He appeared in the fifth season of the television show Alias as Agent Thomas Grace. He starred, alongside Alias costar Ron Rifkin, in the ABC prime time drama Brothers & Sisters, which first aired in September 2006. Getty played the role of Thomas "Tommy" Walker, third-born of the five Walker siblings.

In late 2008, media reports indicated Getty's contract as a full-time series regular in Brothers & Sisters would not be renewed due, in part, to budgetary and storyline considerations. In the Season 4 premiere, Getty was still listed in the principal cast, but he did not appear. Getty made his return to the series in the sixth episode of Season 4. Although he no longer appeared in every episode, he continued to make appearances on the show until its cancellation.

Music career 
Getty started deejaying and making electronic music at age 15. He is a member of the indie rock/electronic band Ringside, and is the producer for rap duo The Wow.

In 2013, he operated a record label called Purplehaus Records. He started Purplehaus Productions in the Fairfax and Melrose district in Los Angeles.

Personal life
In 2000, Getty married fashion designer Rosetta Millington. They have four children, daughters: Grace, Violet, and June Catherine, and a son, Cassius Paul. Cassius's godfather is Getty's close friend and fellow actor Eric Dane. Getty had a highly publicized affair with English actress Sienna Miller in 2008, but later reconciled with his wife.

Social initiatives
Getty is on the board of directors for The Lunchbox Fund, a non-profit organization providing daily meals to township school students in Soweto, South Africa.

Filmography

Awards and nominations

References

External links

1975 births
20th-century American male actors
21st-century American male actors
American film producers
American indie rock musicians
American male child actors
American male film actors
American male television actors
American people of English descent
American people of German descent
American people of Scotch-Irish descent
Balthazar
Living people
Male actors from California
Male actors from San Francisco
People educated at Gordonstoun
People from Tarzana, Los Angeles